Kangaroo is a 2015 Tamil language action thriller film written and directed by Samy and produced by V House Productions. The film features newcomers Arjuna, Varsha Ashwathi and Sri Priyanka in the lead roles, while Thambi Ramaiah, Ganja Karuppu, and Kalabhavan Mani play supporting roles. The music was composed by singer Srinivas, and the film released on 24 April 2015.

Plot 
Murugesan, aged about 10, brings his infant sister to Kodaikanal, where a provision store owner Thakapan Swami Nadar (Thambi Ramiah), takes pity on the kids and gives them a place to stay. A grown Murugesan (Arjuna) is a tea stall owner who looks every bit a ruffian, talks little, does not show any emotions, has animalistic behavior, displays carnivorous eating habits, and drinks arrack in litres. The one person who is the world to him is his sister Azhagu (Sri Priyanka), on whom he dotes so much that people around call him Kangaroo. There is also Chellam (Varsha Ashwathi), a friend of Azhagu who loves Murugesan. The villain group consists of Ticket (Kalabhavan Mani), who wants to push Chellam into the flesh trade with the help of her sister, who is already in it, and a jeep driver who lusts for Azhagu. Murugesan bashes the two men for disturbing his sister and her friend, and an enmity ensues. Murugesan discovers that his sister is in love with another jeep driver Mani and arranges for the marriage between the two, much to the jealousy of Ticket and his friend.  Just before the marriage, Mani falls from a cliff and dies. After a few months, Murugesan convinces Azhagu to marry again and fixes a groom, but this groom dies from electrocution. The sibling duo moves to another town where she gets married, but an attempt on the husband too is made, injuring him severely, and the unknown killer is ready to try again at the hospital. What happens to the brother and sister and who kills off every suitor of Azhagu forms the rest of the screenplay.

Cast
Ranjith Velayudhan (Arjuna) as Murugesan (Kangaroo)
Varsha Ashwathi as Chellam
Sri Priyanka as Azhagu
Thambi Ramiah as Thakapan Swami Nadar
Ganja Karuppu as Kangaroo's friend
Kalabhavan Mani as Ticket
R. Sundarrajan as Sattai 
Ghajini as the police inspector
Director Saamy as Police

Production
Production for the film began in April 2013, with the director Samy revealing that Kangaroo would be a film dedicated to caring mothers and stated that it was a family friendly film, marking a change from the controversial themes of his previous three projects.

Soundtrack
A. R. Rahman was the chief guest for the release of the film's audio soundtrack in December 2013. The songs are composed by Srinivas, with his daughter Sharanya Srinivas singing two songs from the film. Vairamuthu wrote lyrics for the film and stated that despite working on a small budget film, his efforts towards the project were similar to that of his grander ventures. Soundtrack receive positive reviews.
"Penjaka" - Shweta Mohan
"Nenjukkuzhi" - Haricharan, Sharanya Srinivas
"Thaayum Konja Kaalam" - Harihara Sudhan
"Ozhakku Nilave" - Bibin Tuttu
"Yaarukku Yaar" - Srinivas
"Nenjukkuzhi" - Vijay Prakash, Sharanya Srinivas

Reception
Sify wrote "To conclude, comparing to Samy's earlier ventures, Kangaroo is a better, family-friendly movie but in general perspective, it‘s a middling one!". Deccan Chronicle wrote "The plot seems interesting, but the way it unfolds in 80s style with mushy melodrama and insipid comedy, the pace suffers during the first half. However, post interval the momentum picks up with few unexpected twists and turns."

References

External links
 

2015 films
2010s Tamil-language films
Films scored by Srinivas
Indian action thriller films
2015 action thriller films